The Battle of Fleurus of August 29, 1622 was fought in the Spanish Netherlands between a Spanish army, and the Protestant forces of Ernst von Mansfeld and Christian of Brunswick during the Eighty Years' War and Thirty Years' War. The bloody struggle left the Protestants mangled and the Spanish masters of the field and would ensure Catholic dominance in Germany till the intervention of Denmark–Norway.

Campaign
After failing to relieve Heidelberg, besieged by Tilly's army, Frederick V, Elector Palatine, decided to disband his army. On July 13, 1622 the contract was cancelled and the unemployed army of Mansfeld and Christian of Brunswick was hired by the Dutch to help in the relief of the siege of Bergen-op-Zoom. The Protestant army departed from Alsace and at a fast pace crossed Northern France, entering the Spanish Low Countries through Hainaut.

The Spanish Army of Flanders, under command of Ambrogio Spinola, engaged in the siege of Bergen-op-Zoom, a town on the estuary of the Schelde River, was in a dangerous position; while a relieving Dutch army was being assembled to the East at Breda he faced an invasion from the South. He was in danger of being trapped between the two enemy armies, his line of retreat towards Antwerp blocked by the invading German army. To stop that army Gonzalo Fernández de Córdoba, commander of the Spanish army in the Palatinate, was recalled in a hurry from the siege of Heidelberg. Cordoba marched through the Duchy of Luxembourg and the difficult terrain of the Ardennes, and was able to intercept Mansfeld and Brunswick on the border of Brabant. The Protestant army advance guard met Spanish cavalry scouts on 27 August, and two days later they found Córdoba's army entrenched. Córdoba, much weaker in cavalry, had assumed a blocking position north of the town of Mellet, near Fleurus, with flanks supported by woods. The Protestant commanders deployed their army to try to break through the Spanish position.

Armies

SPANISH ARMY

Right Wing
Commander: Gauchier
800 commanded musketeers (in the woods)
5 Cavalry Squadrons in two lines

Center
Commander: Córdoba
Several units brigaded into 4 Escuadrones deployed in a single line
1st Escuadron
	Tercio of Naples (16 companies, Spaniards)
	Tercio Balanzon (2 companies, Burgundians)
	Tercio Verdugo (15 companies, Walloons)
2nd Escuadron
	Isenburg Regiment (10 companies, Lower Rhine Germans)
	Emden Regiment (1 company, Northern Germans)
	4 Free Companies (French)
3rd Escuadron
	Tercio of Capua (14 companies, Italians)
4th Escuadron
	Fugger Regiment (7 companies, Germans)

Left Wing
Commander: De Sylva
4 Cavalry Squadrons in two lines

The Spanish cavalry was composed of 53 small companies, assembled into ad hoc squadrons. There were 29 cuirassier companies and 24 arquebusier companies. 4 of the cuirassier companies were composed of veterans, while the rest had been raised, using Walloon recruits, in 1621 and 1622. These latter had performed poorly at the Battle of Wimpfen, so Cordoba was obviously concerned about the flanks of his army.

The Spanish infantry was of mixed quality. It included the elite Tercio of Naples, which traced its history back to 1567, and had recently lived up to its reputation with a superb performance at the Battle of Wimpfen. Córdoba placed it in the post of honour to the right, blocking the road. The Fugger Regiment and Verdugo Tercio were also experienced units, veterans of the Bohemian campaign, while the rest of the units were garrison troops of lesser quality mobilized by Córdoba to fill his command.

PROTESTANT ARMY

Right Wing
Commander: Streiff
10 Companies of Cavalry deployed in two lines

Center
Commander: Mansfeld
26 understrength Infantry regiments brigaded into 8 composite Battalions deployed in a checkerboard double line

Left Wing
Commander: Brunswick
50 Companies of Cavalry deployed in two lines

The Protestant army had left Sedan with 25,000 men, but the swift march had reduced it to 14,000, many stragglers being killed by angry Walloon peasants.

Protestant cavalry was highly motivated and of good quality. Many of the recruits were members of the German lesser nobility, and most were heavily armoured cuirassiers. The infantry was of much lesser material, poorly equipped, and had suffered the most in the march.

The battle

After a short cannonade, Mansfeld ordered a general advance. Some gaps opened up in the poorly drilled German infantry, and De Sylva attacked an exposed flank, routing one Battalion. However, Streiff counterattacked, the Walloon cavalry was wrong footed and suffered considerable damage from enemy pistol fire. De Sylva's cavalry took refuge behind the baggage wagons, while Streiff turned on the Spanish infantry, but without much success.

On the Protestant left, Brunswick had massed most of his cavalry, Córdoba's deployment made it impossible to outflank his position, but Brunswick hoped to overwhelm the Spanish by a massed frontal assault. The first charge was repulsed by Gauchier's cavalry, but Brunswick reordered his command and launched a second charge, the first line was repulsed again but the second line succeeded in pushing back the Walloon Horse.

Brunswick turned then against the Spanish infantry, but his own infantry failed to adequately support the attack, the Tercio of Naples held its ground, and murderous enfilade fire from musketeers ambushed in the nearby woods sent the Protestant cavalry reeling back in disorder.

In a final charge, Brunswick was wounded, and his cavalry, demoralised, finally fell back. After five hours of fighting, Mansfeld ordered a general retreat, it was midday and he intended to take the road through Liège around Córdoba to reach Breda.

The Spanish army was too tired to follow the enemy. The next day, Córdoba sent Gauchier with the cavalry, although it caught up with the rear guard of the Protestant army, it managed to continue its march, defeat a small local army trying to block it, and rally at Tongeren. From there it started a six-hour night march to Breda, reaching it exhausted and without much of its equipment. Within days however the Dutch had re-equipped the circa 10,000 left in Mansfeld's army from state arsenals.

Aftermath

As the Spanish army had failed to block Brunswick and Mansfeld, Spinola was compelled to lift the siege of Bergen-op-Zoom. Brunswick and Mansfeld only served for three months in Dutch pay, their unruly bands having no place in the disciplined Dutch army. Meanwhile, Tilly's army easily overran the Palatinate.

Notes

References
 Cánovas del Castillo, Antonio. Estudios del reinado de Felipe IV vol. II (Madrid 1888) ( letter from the Marques of Bedmar to King Philip IV published here)
 Crosse, William, fl. 1630, supposed author.  Belgiaes troubles, and triumphs.  Wherein are truly and historically related all the most famous occurrences, which have happened betweene the Spainards, and Hollanders in these last foure yeares warres of the Netherlands, with other accidents, which have had relation unto them, as the battles of Fleurie, and Statloo, the losse of Gulicke and Breda, the sieges of Sluce and Bergen, the conquest of St. Salvador in Brasília, and the taking of Goffe by Charles Lambert, &c.  London, Printed by A. Matthewes, and I. Norton, 1625
 Fernández Alvarez, Manuel. Don Gonzalo Fernández de Córdoba y la guerra de sucessión de Mantua y del Monferrato (1627–1629).  Madrid, Consejo Superior de Investigaciones Científicas, Escuela de Historia Moderna, 1955
 Groot, Bouko de. Dutch Armies of the 80 Years' War 1568-1648 (Oxford, 2017) Vol. 1  & vol. 2  
 Guthrie, William P. Battles of the Thirty Years' War, From White Mountain to Nördlingen 1618-1635 (Westport, 2002) 
 Haynin, Louis de, seigneur du Cornet, 1582-1640. Histoire generalle des guerres de Savoie, de Boheme, du Palatinat, et Pays-Bas, depuis l’an 1616. jusques celuy de 1627. inclus.  IU, RBC x943.03 H33h (Douai, 1628).
 Mesa, Eduardo de, Nördlingen 1634 (Madrid 2003)

External links

 https://web.archive.org/web/20091027122615/http://www.geocities.com/aow1617/fleurusuk.html
 Ernst von Mansfeld - modern biography in German, taking a different view of the battle and its outcome (p. 444-454).
 Contemporary pamphlet - a contemporary news pamphlet in the Rijksmuseum Amsterdam

1622 in the Habsburg Netherlands
Conflicts in 1622
Eighty Years' War
European wars of religion
Battles involving the Holy Roman Empire
Battles of the Thirty Years' War
Battles of the Eighty Years' War
Battles involving the Spanish Netherlands
Battle